Events from the year 1930 in Taiwan, Empire of Japan.

Incumbents

Central government of Japan
 Prime Minister: Hamaguchi Osachi

Taiwan
 Governor-General – Ishizuka Eizō

Events

October
 18 October – The opening of Changhua Wude Hall in Taichū Prefecture.
 27 October – Start of Musha Incident.

Births
 25 July – Wang Jui, actor

Deaths
 28 November – Mona Rudao, Seediq chief

References

 
Years of the 20th century in Taiwan